Eastern Ojibwe (also known as Ojibway, Ojibwa) is a dialect of the Ojibwe language spoken north of Lake Ontario and east of Georgian Bay in Ontario, Canada. Eastern Ojibwe-speaking communities include Rama and Curve Lake. Ojibwe is an Algonquian language.

See also
 Ojibwe language
 Ojibwe dialects

Notes

References

 King, Alice and Jean Rogers. Ed. John Nichols. 1985. The Stories of Alice King of Parry Island. Algonquian and Iroquoian Linguistics, Readers and Study Guides. Winnipeg: Department of Native Studies, University of Manitoba. 
 King, Alice and Jean Rogers. 1988. "Parry Island Texts." Edited by Leonard Bloomfield and John D. Nichols. John Nichols, ed., An Ojibwe Text Anthology, 69-106. London: The Centre for Teaching and Research of Canadian Native Languages, University of Western Ontario. 
 Rhodes, Richard. 1976. "A Preliminary Report on the Dialects of Eastern Ojibwa–Odawa." W. Cowan, ed., Papers of the Seventh Algonquian Conference, 129-156. Ottawa: Carleton University.
 Rhodes, Richard A. 1985. Eastern Ojibwa–Chippewa–Ottawa Dictionary. Berlin: Mouton de Gruyter. 
 Rhodes, Richard and Evelyn Todd. 1981. "Subarctic Algonquian Languages." June Helm, ed., The Handbook of North American Indians, Volume 6. Subarctic, 52-66. Washington, D.C.: The Smithsonian Institution.
 Rogers, Edward. 1978. "Southeastern Ojibwa." Bruce Trigger, ed., The Handbook of North American Indians, Volume 15. Northeast, 760-771. Washington, D.C.: The Smithsonian Institution.
 Snache, Irene. 2005. Ojibwe Language Dictionary.Rama, ON: Mnjikaning Kendaaswin Publishers. 
 Valentine, J. Randolph. 1994. Ojibwe Dialect Relationships. PhD dissertation, University of Texas, Austin.

External links
OLAC resources in and about the Eastern Ojibwa language

Central Algonquian languages
Ojibwa language, Eastern
Indigenous languages of the North American eastern woodlands
First Nations languages in Canada